Quicksilver Tuna is an album by Slowblow, originally released in 1994 by Sirkafúsk Records and re-released by Smekkleysa in 2004.

Track listing
"Put An Effect Upon My Voice" - 3:39
"Is Jesus Your Pal?" - 3:33
"Have you Seen My Dream?" - 2:11
"Night & Day" - 3:24
"Spiral Eyes" - 3:57 
"Dirty Side Of Town" - 4:39
"Tell Me If I Should Care" - 2:26
"No Credibility" - 4:57
"Bodybag" - 2:51
"Rain's House" - 4:05
"Piano" - 2:12
"Quicksilver Tuna" - 2:07

1994 albums
Slowblow albums